Farm to Market Road 1764 (FM 1764) is a  state highway in the U.S. state of Texas. It is a farm to market road existing entirely within Galveston County that connects Santa Fe to Texas City via a short stretch of freeway known as the Emmett F. Lowry Expressway. The highway was designated in the 1950s.

Route description
The western terminus of FM 1764 is at State Highway 6 (SH 6) in Santa Fe. From there, the route heads north slightly and then east, through farmland approximately  towards junctions with FM 2004 and Interstate 45 (I-45) near Texas City.

At this point, FM 1764 transitions to a freeway segment which serves as a spur from I-45 into Texas City from points north—continuous travel between the western and eastern segments of FM 1764 requires use of frontage roads at the I-45 junction as there is no direct access. The expressway is named after Emmett F. Lowry, who served as mayor of Texas City from 1964 until his death in 1989 and was instrumental in the construction of the thoroughfare.

Once inside Texas City, FM 1764 becomes a city street. From SH 146, it follows Palmer Highway eastward, then curves slightly to the south to become 9th Avenue North. The eastern end of FM 1764 is at the intersection of 9th Avenue North and 14th Street, adjacent to Texas City High School.

History
FM 1764 was first designated on May 23, 1951, and was defined to run from the then new routing of U.S. Route 75 (now I-45) east to SH 146. On December 17, 1952, the highway was expanded westward to its current terminus at SH 6 at Arcadia. On November 21, 1956, FM 1764 was extended east into Texas City to its current eastern terminus at 14th Street.

On June 27, 1995 the internal designation of the route was changed to Urban Road 1764 (UR 1764). The designation reverted to FM 1764 with the elimination of the Urban Road system on November 15, 2018.

Major intersections

See also

References

1764
Freeways in Texas
Transportation in Galveston County, Texas